The Western Carolinas League was a Class D (1948–52; 1960–62) and a low Class A (1963–79) full-season league in American minor league baseball. The WCL changed its name prior to the 1980 season and has been known since as the South Atlantic League, a highly successful Class A circuit with teams up the Eastern Seaboard from Georgia to New Jersey.

Originally called the "Western Carolina League", the 1948–52 WCL was composed exclusively of teams located in the Piedmont and Blue Ridge sections of western North Carolina. It merged with the North Carolina State League to form the short-lived Class D Tar Heel League, which lasted only 1½ seasons (1953–54) before folding.

In 1960, the WCL was revived as a Class D circuit intended to house farm teams of the member clubs of a planned third major league, the Continental League. It featured teams in eight North Carolina locales: Gastonia, Hickory, Lexington, Newton–Conover, Rutherford County, Salisbury, Shelby and Statesville, but soon expanded to sites in South Carolina.

It was upgraded to Class A in the 1963 reorganization of the minor leagues. The first professional baseball team based in Monroe, North Carolina came into being when the Statesville Indians moved into town on June 20, 1969 and finished the year as the Monroe Indians. The team lasted just one season before being replaced by the Sumter Indians.

For nearly 60 years, 1948 through 2007, the WCL/SAL's dominant figure was league founder and president John Henry Moss, who started the WCL as a young man in 1948, refounded it in 1960 and then led it into the new century. Moss, also the longtime mayor of Kings Mountain, North Carolina, retired at the close of the 2007 Sally League season and died, at age 90, on July 1, 2009.

Member teams

Western Carolina League (1948–52)

 Forest City Owls
 Gastonia Browns
 Granite Falls Graniteers
 Hendersonville Skylarks
 Hickory Rebels
 Lenoir Red Sox

 Lincolnton Cardinals
 Marion Marauders
 Morganton Aggies
 Newton-Conover Twins
 Rutherford County Owls
 Shelby Farmers

Western Carolinas League (1960–79)

 Anderson Giants
 Anderson Mets
 Anderson Senators
 Anderson Tigers
 Asheville Tourists
 Belmont Chiefs
 Charleston Patriots
 Charleston Pirates
 Charlotte Twins
 Gastonia Cardinals
 Gastonia Pirates
 Gastonia Rangers
 Gastonia Rippers
 Greensboro Hornets
 Greenville Braves
 Greenville Mets
 Greenville Rangers
 Greenville Red Sox
 Greenwood Braves
 Hickory Rebels
Lexington Braves
 Lexington Giants
 Lexington Indians
 Monroe Pirates
 Newton-Conover Twins
 Orangeburg Cards
 Orangeburg Dodgers
 Rock Hill Cardinals
 Rock Hill Indians
 Rock Hill Wrens
 Rutherford County Owls
 Salisbury Astros
 Salisbury Braves
 Salisbury Dodgers
 Salisbury Senators
 Shelby Colonels
 Shelby Pirates
 Shelby Rebels
 Shelby Reds
 Shelby Senators
 Shelby Yankees
 Spartanburg Phillies
 Statesville Colts
 Statesville/Monroe Indians
 Statesville Owls
 Statesville Tigers
 Sumter Astros
 Sumter Indians
 Thomasville Hi-Toms

League Champions

1963 Greenville Braves
1964 Salisbury Dodgers
1965 Rock Hill Cardinals
1966 Spartanburg Phillies
1967 Spartanburg Phillies
1968 Greenwood Braves
1969 Greenwood Braves
1970 Greenville Red Sox
1971 Greenwood Braves
1972 Spartanburg Phillies
1973 Spartanburg Phillies
1974 Gastonia Rangers
1975 Spartanburg Phillies
1976 Greenwood Braves
1977 Gastonia Cardinals
1978 Greenwood Braves
1979 Greenwood Braves

South Atlantic Hall of Fame
 The South Atlantic League Hall of Fame was founded in 1994 and includes Western Carolinas League alumni.

References

Defunct minor baseball leagues in the United States
Baseball leagues in North Carolina
Baseball leagues in South Carolina
Sports leagues established in 1963
Sports leagues disestablished in 1979